The  New Zealand Institute of Environmental Health (NZIEH) is a non-governmental, non-profit organisation that promotes best practice in environmental health and represents those engaged in environmental and health protection fields in New Zealand.  It was incorporated as a Society in 1920 and is a member of the International Federation of Environmental Health.

Activities

A representative from NZIEH was part of the committee that produced the 2010 NZS 6806 standard on "Acoustics – Road traffic noise" on behalf of Standards New Zealand.

References

External links
 Official website

Medical and health organisations based in New Zealand
Environmental organisations based in New Zealand
Environmental health organizations
Organizations established in 1920